Sean Clark is a video game designer, director and programmer who worked on a number of notable LucasArts adventure games from early 1990 through to 2022

Game development history 
 Indiana Jones and the Last Crusade: The Graphic Adventure (1989)
 Loom (1990)
 The Secret of Monkey Island (1990)
 Indiana Jones and the Fate of Atlantis (1992)
 Sam & Max Hit the Road (1993)
 The Dig (1995)
 Big Sky Trooper (1996)
 Escape from Monkey Island (2000)
 Full Throttle II: Hell on Wheels (2002; unreleased)

External links
 
 

Living people
Lucasfilm people
Video game designers
Video game directors
Year of birth missing (living people)